Just an Old Sweet Song is a 1976 TV film by MTM Enterprises and Company Four, based on the novel of the same name that also came out in the same year. Melvin Van Pebbles wrote the books as well as music composition and writing for the film.

Plot 
A family from Detroit takes a two-week vacation in the south which makes multiple changes in their life they didn't think were possible.

Cast 

 Cicely Tyson as Precilla
 Robert Hooks as Nate
 Kevin Hooks as Junior
 Beah Richards as Grandma
 Eric Hooks as Highpockets
 Mary Alice as Helen
 Edward Binns as Mr. Claypool
 Sonny Jim Gaines as Trunk
 Minnie Gentry as Aunt Velvet

Home Media 
United American Video released a VHS copy of the film on October 9, 1998.

References 

1976 films
MTM Enterprises films
Films directed by Robert Ellis Miller
Television films based on books
American television films
Films based on books
1970s English-language films